The Adam Smith Chair of Political Economy is a chair at the University of Glasgow, named for Adam Smith, pioneering economist, author of The Wealth of Nations, and one of the university's most famous sons. It was established in 1896 from a lectureship which had been endowed in 1892 by Andrew Stewart, founder of Stewarts & Lloyds tube-manufacturers. Occupants are appointed by the University Court acting with a representative of the Merchants' House of Glasgow, the Trades House of Glasgow and the Chamber of Commerce of Glasgow.

History
The first occupant of the chair was William Smart. He had previously been lecturer in Political Economy at Queen Margaret College and the university's first official lecturer in Political Economy. He remained in the chair until his death in 1915, and was succeeded the same year by William Scott. Scott, originally from Northern Ireland, was a political economy lecturer at the University of St Andrews when appointed, and an authority on Adam Smith. He served as president of the Royal Philosophical Society of Glasgow from 1931 to 1934 and of the Royal Economic Society from 1935 to 1937. Scott also remained in the chair until his death, in 1940. He was succeeded by Alec Macfie in 1945. He had a distinguished career, retiring in 1958, and was dean of Faculties from 1974 to 1978. In 1990, the James Bonar Chair of Political Economy was renamed the Bonar-Macfie Chair.

In 1958, Thomas Wilson was appointed to the chair from Oxford. Originally from Northern Ireland, Wilson had studied at Queen's University Belfast and the London School of Economics, and worked during the War in the Ministries of Economic Warfare and Aircraft Production and the Prime Minister's Statistical Branch, being appointed an OBE in the 1945 Prime Minister's Resignation Honours. He retired in 1985 and was succeeded that year by David Vines. Vines was appointed shortly after completing his PhD at the University of Cambridge, and left Glasgow in 1992 to become a Fellow in Economics at Balliol College, Oxford, becoming a professor of economics at Oxford in 2000.

In 1994, Andrew Skinner, the university's Daniel Jack Professor of Economics, was appointed to the Adam Smith Chair. He was succeeded in the Daniel Jack Chair by Anton Muscatelli, now Principal of the University. Skinner was a graduate of the university and served as dean of the Faculty of Social Sciences, Clerk of Senate and vice-principal, retiring in 2000. He was succeeded by Gary Koop.

In 2005, Ronald MacDonald, Professor of International Finance at the University of Strathclyde, was appointed to the chair. MacDonald is an internationally respected economist and an authority on exchange rates. Alongside his consulting work, he holds the chair on a part-time basis.

Andrew Stewart
Andrew Stewart (1832–1901) was born in Johnstone and grew up in Glasgow. He became an apprentice to a tube-manufacturer, and established his own business in 1861, selling pipes for gas and water. In 1867, he and his brother, James, formed a partnership, A & J Stewart, which went on to become Stewarts & Lloyds, one of the largest steel tube-manufacturers in the country. In 1896, he made a gift to the University of Glasgow to establish the Adam Smith Chair in Political Economy. The university awarded him an LLD in 1900.

Adam Smith Professors of Political Economy
1896-1915: William Smart
1915-1940: William Robert Scott
1945-1958: Alec Lawrence Macfie
1958-1985: Thomas Wilson
1985-1992: David Vines
1994-2000: Andrew Stewart Skinner
2000-2005: Gary Koop
2005–present: Ronald MacDonald

See also
List of Professorships at the University of Glasgow

References

1892 establishments in Scotland
Political Economy, Smith, Adam
Political Economy, Smith, Adam, Glasgow